Farforth or Farforth-cum-Maidenwell is a hamlet in the East Lindsey district of Lincolnshire, England.

The parish church is dedicated to Saint Peter and is a Grade II listed building, rebuilt in 1861 using material from a previous medieval church. The font dates from the 15th century. The 1861 rebuilding in Early English style was financed by the family of William and Francis Osiear and the Corporation of Basingstoke. William and Francis Osiear are commemorated through an engraved brass plate in the chancel.

References

External links

"Farforth cum Maidenwell", Genuki.org.uk. Retrieved 27 June 2013

Hamlets in Lincolnshire
East Lindsey District